Stefan Gavrilović (Sremski Karlovci, c. 1750-Sremski Karlovci, 1823) was an 18th-century-19th-century Serbian painter known best for his iconostasis and frescoes.

He is considered one of the masters of Neoclassical and late Baroque paintings, and was very influenced by Jakov Orfelin and Teodor Kračun. Georgije Bakalović was one of his pupils.

Gavrilović, whose work anticipated the arrival of the new artistic tendency—the Neoclassicism—had his studio workshop in Sremski Karlovci. He made many flags for the First Serbian Uprising against the Ottoman Empire. He authored Mojsije Putnik's portrait, among many other paintings, icons and frescoes.

References

19th-century Serbian painters
Serbian male painters
18th-century Serbian people
19th-century Serbian male artists